Claudia Kahr (born 30 September 1955, in Graz) has been a judge at the Austrian Constitutional Court since 1999. Following law studies at the University of Graz, she received her Doctor of Law degree in 1978, and attended the College of Europe during the 1978–1979 academic year. She heads the board of directors of ASFINAG.

External links 
 Biografie auf der Seite des Verfassungsgerichtshofs

References 

1955 births
College of Europe alumni
Austrian women judges
People from Graz
University of Graz alumni
Living people
Austrian judges